(October 14, 1908 – July 3, 1989) was a Japanese singer of ryūkōka, gunka, and opera.

Biography
Nitta was born  in the village of Shussei (today part of Tsugaru), Nishitsugaru District, Aomori Prefecture in 1908. His father, an elementary school teacher, encouraged Nitta's academic promise. He later enrolled in the Aomori Prefectural Normal School (today part of Hirosaki University). Although initially determined to become a teacher himself, Nitta's budding interest in music eventually led to his enrollment at the Tokyo School of Music in 1926. The following year, Nitta dropped out and returned to Aomori, where he taught at a girls' school and composed music in his spare time.

In 1935, Nitta returned to Tokyo to continue his musical studies. During this time, he signed onto Taihei Records as a singer and performed in opera, using the stage name . Three years later, he moved to Nippon Victor as an exclusive artist, whereupon he chose "Nitta Hachirō" as his permanent stage name. Nitta enjoyed the peak of his fame during the late 1930s and early 1940s. Japanese servicemen deployed in the Nan'yō region devised a contrafactum of the song called , which was popularized throughout Japan after they were demobilized.

He died at the age of 81 in 1989.

References

1908 births
1989 deaths
20th-century Japanese male opera singers
King Records (Japan) artists
People from Aomori Prefecture
Victor Entertainment artists
Tokyo Music School alumni